Robbie Sihota (born October 18, 1987) is a Canadian-Indian retired basketball player. Sihota played at the power forward position.

Professional career
On February 25, 2016, Sihota signed with Eisbären Bremerhaven.

Honours
DBL rebounding leader (1): 2010–11

References

External links
Dutch Basketball League profile 
Profile at slansportsmanagement.com

1987 births
Living people
Basketball people from Alberta
Calgary Dinos men's basketball players
Canadian men's basketball players
Dutch Basketball League players
Eisbären Bremerhaven players
Feyenoord Basketball players
Matrixx Magixx players
Power forwards (basketball)
Sportspeople from Calgary
Canadian expatriate basketball people in Hungary